Beinn na Gucaig (616 m) is a mountain in the Grampian Mountains of Scotland, located south of Fort William in Lochaber.

The peak takes up much of the eastern shore of Loch Linnhe and provides an excellent view of Ben Nevis from its summit.

References

Mountains and hills of Highland (council area)
Marilyns of Scotland
Grahams